JTK may refer to:
 Ibanez Jet King, a family of electric guitars
 James T. Kirk, a character in the Star Trek media franchise
 Junior Tia-Kilifi (born 1988), New Zealand rugby league player
  Josh Okorie , a Multi Platinum Producer who comes from Chicago, Illinois, his instagram is @jtk2bz